Stear is a surname. Notable people with the surname include:

John Stear, member of Australian Skeptics
Mark Stear (born 1958), English cricketer
Michael Stear (1938–2020), Royal Air Force Air Marshal

See also
Stears